KataGo is a free and open-source computer Go program, capable of defeating top-level human players. First released on 27 February 2019, it is developed by David Wu.

Based on techniques used by DeepMind's AlphaGo Zero, KataGo implements Monte Carlo tree search with a convolutional neural network providing position evaluation and policy guidance. Compared to AlphaGo, KataGo introduces many refinements that enable it to learn faster and play more strongly.
Notable features of KataGo that are absent in many other Go-playing programs include score estimation; support for small boards, arbitrary values of komi, and handicaps; and the ability to use various Go rulesets and adjust its play and evaluation for the small differences between them.

KataGo's first release was trained by David Wu using resources provided by his employer Jane Street Capital, but it is now trained by a distributed effort. Members of the computer Go community provide computing resources by running the client, which generates self-play games and rating games, and submits them to a server. The self-play games are used to train newer networks and the rating games to evaluate the networks' relative strengths.

KataGo supports the Go Text Protocol, with various extensions, thus making it compatible with popular GUIs such as Lizzie. As an alternative, it also implements a custom "analysis engine" protocol, which is used by the KaTrain GUI, among others. KataGo is widely used by strong human go players, including the South Korean national team, for training purposes. KataGo is also used as the default analysis engine in the online Go website AI Sensei, as well as OGS (the Online Go Server).

In 2022, KataGo was used as the target for adversarial attack research, designed to demonstrate the "surprising failure modes" of AI systems. The researchers were able to trick KataGo into ending the game prematurely.

References

External links
KataGo on GitHub
KataGo on Sensei's Library
KataGo Training website

Go engines
Free and open-source software
2019 software
Applied machine learning